William Croft (born November 13, 1956) is an American professor of linguistics at the University of New Mexico, United States. From 1994 to 2005 he was successively research fellow, lecturer, reader and professor in Linguistics at the University of Manchester, UK.

He is the inventor of and advocate for radical construction grammar, which among other things uses box-diagrams to compare and contrast the grammatical features of different natural languages. He is considered an influential scholar in the fields of functional and cognitive linguistics.

William Croft is a member of Save the Redwoods League's Board of Councillors.

Partial bibliography
 Syntactic Categories and Grammatical Relations: The Cognitive Organization of Information (1991) 
 Explaining language change: an evolutionary approach (2001) 
 Radical Construction Grammar: Syntactic theory in typological perspective (2001) 
 Typology and Universals, 2nd ed. (Cambridge Textbooks in Linguistics) (2003) 
 1st ed. (1990) 
 Cognitive Linguistics (Cambridge Textbooks in Linguistics)  (2004) with D. A. Cruse 
 Verbs: aspect and causal structure (2012)

References

External links
 Faculty page at the University of New Mexico

1956 births
Linguists from the United States
Syntacticians
Living people
University of New Mexico faculty
Fellows of the Linguistic Society of America
20th-century linguists
20th-century American academics
21st-century linguists
21st-century American academics